South Carolina Highway 89 (SC 89) was a state highway that existed in the southeastern part of Pickens County. Its entire path was in the northern part of Easley.

Route description
SC 89 began at an intersection with SC 8 in the northwestern part of the city. It traveled to the east-northeast and reached its eastern terminus, an intersection with SC 135.

History
SC 89 was established in 1940. It was decommissioned in 1947 and was downgraded to a secondary road. Today, it is known as Fleetwood Drive.

Major intersections

See also

References

External links
Former SC 32 at the Virginia Highways South Carolina Annex

089
Transportation in Pickens County, South Carolina
Easley, South Carolina